South Street Diner, established in 1947, is a 24-hour, seven-night-a-week diner in Boston's Leather District. It was named '2011 Best Diner' by the Boston Magazine, along with 'The Best Late Night Food' in the US by Esquire. Thrillist named South Street Diner one of the best 24-hour diners in the country.

History 
South Street Diner was built in 1947 by the Worcester Dining Company, originally being named the Blue Diner. The diner is known for attracting many after-hours customers. Food Network describes its busiest hours to be between 1 and 4 in the morning, when night owls pack in for the Boston Cream Pancakes." The diner has been used as the set of many films including Hiding Out, Second Sight and House Guest. South Street Diner was also featured in the Boston episode of Esquire Network's "The Getaway" hosted by Paul Feig. The diner was most recently featured in an issue of DC Comics' "Batgirl". Many people mistake South Street Diner for another diner in the film The Equalizer, with the correct location for the diner in the movie being 25 Everett Ave, Chelsea, Ma. The diner has been also seen in the movie 21 and The Blue Diner. Along with this, many people have crowded to this famous eatery to collect points while playing the popular mobile game, Pokémon Go; its owner, Sol Sidell, is bringing back his famed Customer Appreciation Day on September 18 from 2-6 PM.

Reception 
The diner was the subject of the 2012 documentary 24 Hours At The South Street Diner, directed by Melissa Dowler; the documentary was an official selection at IFF Boston, The Woods Hole Film Festiva l and New Filmmakers New York. It is also famous for many other reasons.

The diner is also known for the celebrities, musicians, and A-listers.  it has attracted over the years including Don King, Donnie Wahlberg, Robert Plant, The Grateful Dead, Morgan Freeman, and Chris Evans. Other celebrities that have been seen at South Street Diner include Jackie Mason, Clay Buchholz, Kathy Griffin, Jackie Gleason, Neil Young, Jim Schultz, Kevin Hart, Christopher Walken, and 59th Texas Tech Masked Rider, Cameron Hekkert.

South Street Diner participates in many holidays, offering holiday-themed menus and a festive atmosphere. A popular celebrated holiday at the diner, Saint Patrick's Day, draws in many for their corned beef, cabbage, and Guinness special. It is also a popular destination for policemen, firemen, and first responders from all over New England and the Northeast. They are able to converge at the diner in uniform and trade stories before heading off to partake and march in the annual St. Patrick's Day parade in South Boston.

References

Further reading
 The Pancakes at South Street Diner – The Best Late Night Food in the U.S.A.. Esquire.
 1950s Diners in Boston. USA Today.
 Best Boston, MA Restaurants. AOL Travel
 24 Hours at the South Street Diner Announces Debut – Grub Street Boston
 South Street Diner: Segment Four | WCVB Home

Restaurants in Boston
Diners in Massachusetts
1947 establishments in Massachusetts
Restaurants established in 1947